Icacinales is an order of Angiosperms.

The order did not exist in the 2009 APG III system, and was added in the 2016 APG IV system, including two families, Icacinaceae and Oncothecaceae, which were both unplaced families in APG III.

References

Asterids
Angiosperm orders